Theophylact Bache ( – ) was an American merchant.

He landed in New York 17 September 1751, took charge of the business of Paul Richard, who died in 1756, became the owner of merchant vessels, and engaged in privateering. He was identified with American resistance to England in 1765, and in 1770 was one of the committee to carry out the resolutions of non-intercourse. In 1774 he was one of the committee of correspondence appointed when the port of Boston was closed. He supported the first Continental Congress; but when the American Revolutionary War actually began he remained so far neutral as to incur the suspicions of the committee of safety. He remained in New York during the British occupation of the city, and befriended American officers held there as prisoners of war. In 1777 he was chosen the fifth president of the New York Chamber of Commerce.

Bache died on 30 October 1807.

Created via preloaddraft
1735 births
1807 deaths
People from Settle, North Yorkshire
American merchants